Appias aegis, the forest white, is a butterfly in the family Pieridae. It is found in south-east Asia.

Subspecies
The following subspecies are recognised:
Appias aegis aegis (Philippines: Mindanao)
Appias aegis illana (C. & R. Felder, 1862) (Philippines: Luzon)
Appias aegis cynis (Hewitson, [1866]) (Peninsular Malaya)
Appias aegis pryeri (Distant, 1885) (Pulau Tioman, Pulau Aur)
Appias aegis caepia Fruhstorfer, 1910 (Philippines: Palawan)
Appias aegis gerasa Fruhstorfer, 1910 (Sula Islands)
Appias aegis polisma (Hewitson, [1861]) (northern Sulawesi)
Appias aegis aegina (Fruhstorfer, 1899) (southern Sulawesi)

References

Appias (butterfly)
Butterflies described in 1861
Butterflies of Indochina
Taxa named by Baron Cajetan von Felder
Taxa named by Rudolf Felder